Emmanuel Lalande (24 December 1868 – 31 August 1926), known as Marc Haven, was a French doctor and occultist. He was one of Papus’ most faithful companions and the son-in-law of Maître Philippe. He was also a member of the first Supreme Council of the Ordre Martiniste.

Bibliography

Works by Marc Haven 
 Turris Eburnea, Chamuel, 1892
 La Vie et les œuvres de Maître Arnaud de Villeneuve, Chamuel, 1896
 Le Maître Inconnu Cagliostro, Dorbon aîné, 1912
 Le Tarot, l’Alphabet Hébraïque et les Nombres, Derain, 1937
 Le Corps, le cœur de l’homme et l’esprit, Derain, 1961

Translations 
 Henri Corneille Agrippa, La magie d’Arbatel, Henri Durville, 1910
 Alessandro Cagliostro, L’Évangile de Cagliostro, Librairie Hermétique, 1910
 LAO TSEU, Tao Te King, Dervy, 1994

Prefaces 
 Paracelse, Les Sept livres de l’Archidoxe magique, Librairie du Merveilleux, 1909
 Jacques Gaffarel, Profonds mystères de la Cabale divine, Beaudelot, 1912
 Karl D'Eckarthausen, La Nuée sur le sanctuaire, Museum Hermeticum, 1914
 Mutus Liber, Derain, 1942
 Philippe D'Aquin, Interprétation de l’arbre de la Cabale, Cahiers Astrologiques, 1946
 Heinrich Khunrath, L’Amphithéâtre de la Sagesse Éternelle, Derain, 1946

Books on Marc Haven 
 Mme Emmanuel Lalande, Marc Haven [docteur Emmanuel Lalande], Pythagore, 1934

References 

1868 births
1926 deaths
French occult writers
19th-century occultists
20th-century occultists
Martinism
19th-century French physicians
20th-century French physicians
Place of birth missing
19th-century French male writers
20th-century French male writers